Şäyxi Mannur (1905–1980) was a Soviet-Tatar poet, translator, and journalist.

Biography 
Şäyxi Mannur was born  in the village of Tulbay in peasants' family.

In 1921, he left for Siberia, where he lived in different places and worked at different jobs. In 1927-1929 he served in the army. After completing his military service, he left for the Donbas, where he first got a job as a rolling agent at a metallurgical plant, later he was a school teacher and a concrete worker at the construction of Dneproges; there he intensified his literary activity. Later, he worked for some time in the editorial office of the Tatar-language newspaper "Eşçe" ("Worker", Moscow), and in 1933 he moved to Kazan, where he graduated from the Kazan Pedagogical University in 1937. During the German-Soviet War, he was at the front as a war correspondent, in 1944 he joined the CPSU (however, he was subsequently expelled from the party for his position on certain issues). In 1946 he was appointed head of the literary part of the Kazan Opera and Ballet Theater and worked in this position until 1948. From 1949 until the end of his life he was a professional writer.

Works 
His first literary works were published in 1923.
  (1929) (From the depths of the taiga)
  (1929) (Over the pyrite mountains)
  (1934) (Grandfather Ğaycan)
  (1934) (Songs of the heart)
  (1968) (Musa, dedicated to Musa Cälil)
  (1974) (Looking at flowing waters, autobiographical)
  (1974-1976) (Is there true love?)
 collections of poems for children.

Mannur translated the works of Russian (Alexander Pushkin, Mikhail Lermontov, Ivan Krylov, etc.), Ukrainian (Taras Shevchenko), and other (Shota Rustaveli, Zhambyl) poets into Tatar.

References

External links 

1905 births
1980 deaths
Tatar journalists
Tatar poets